The Jiuqu Xi river (also Jiuqu River), is the river rising in the Wuyi Mountains or Wuyishan, formerly known as Bohea Hills in early Western documents. The river and the mountain range are located in the prefecture of Nanping, in northern Fujian province near the border with Jiangxi province, China. The region is known worldwide for its status as a refugium for several rare and endemic plant species, its river valleys, and the abundance of important temples and archeological sites, which also earned the area a UNESCO World Heritage Site status.

The Jiuqu Xi river is about 60 kilometers in length, meanders in a deep gorge among these hills. In most places, it is a slow, shallow stream navigable only by small craft like rowboats and canoes.

See also
Jiuzhaigou Valley
Huangguoshu Waterfall

References

External links
Description of natural features 

Mountain ranges of Jiangxi
Wuyi
Geography of East China
Highest points of Chinese provinces
Biosphere reserves of China
AAAAA-rated tourist attractions
Tourist attractions in Fujian
World Heritage Sites in China
Parks in Fujian
Rivers of Jiangxi
Rivers of Fujian